WADV (940 AM) is a radio station licensed to Lebanon, Pennsylvania, United States. The station is currently owned by the Kochel family under holding company Wadv Radio, Inc. It went silent on December 5, 2019 due to problems with the transmitter. After notifying the FCC in February 2020 of the shutdown (citing a transmitter failure), the Kochels ceased responding to inquiries about the station. As of January 2021, WADV resumed broadcasting after replacing their transmitter.

References

External links

Radio stations established in 1977
Southern Gospel radio stations in the United States
ADV